The following is a list of squads for all 6 national teams that competed at the 1946 South American Championship.

Argentina
Head Coach: Guillermo Stábile

Bolivia
Head Coach:  Diógenes Lara

Brazil
Head coach:  Flávio Costa

Chile
Head Coach:  Luis Tirado

Paraguay
Head Coach:  Aurelio González

Uruguay
Head Coach:  Aníbal Tejada

References

squads
Copa América squads